Neopotamia cathemacta is a moth of the family Tortricidae. It is found in Thailand and Taiwan.

References

Moths described in 1989
Olethreutini